Chui Sai-cheong (born 19 February 1954 in Macau) is a member and the First Secretary of the Legislative Assembly of Macau. He is the older brother of Fernando Chui the former Chief Executive of Macau and cousin of José Chui also a member of the Legislative Assembly.

Election results

References

1954 births
Living people
Cantonese people
Members of the Legislative Assembly of Macau